Donald Robert Uhlmann (b. 1936) is the Professor of Materials Science and Engineering and Professor of Optical Science at the University of Arizona in Tucson, Arizona, where he is also Chairman of the Department of Materials Science and Engineering.

Uhlmann holds a BS degree in physics from Yale University and a Ph.D. in applied physics from Harvard University. He was a professor at the Massachusetts Institute of Technology for more than two decades, eventually holding its Cabot Professorship of Materials, before moving to the University of Arizona

He is a Fellow of the American Ceramic Society, and of the U.K. Society of Glass Technology. He has been elected a member of the Academy of Ceramics. He was also elected as a member into the U.S. National Academy of Engineering in 1996 for achievements in glass technology and in optical and structural applications of glass. He is a Trustee of the Ernst Abbe Foundation and on the Advisory Board of the Institute fur Neue Materialien, both located in Germany, and is a director of Magna Mirrors of America, Inc.

He has published over 400 technical papers, and is the author or editor of over 10 books.

References

External links 
 Donald R. Uhlmann | College of Optical Sciences | The University of Arizona
 Facilities
 Dr. Donald R. Uhlmann

1935 births
Living people
Yale College alumni
Harvard School of Engineering and Applied Sciences alumni
21st-century American engineers
MIT School of Engineering faculty
University of Arizona faculty
Fellows of the American Ceramic Society